Toys in the Attic is the third studio album by American rock band Aerosmith, released on April 8, 1975, by Columbia Records. Its first single, "Sweet Emotion", was released on May 19 and the original version of "Walk This Way" followed on August 28 in the same year. The album is the band's most commercially successful studio LP in the United States, with nine million copies sold, according to the RIAA. In 2003, the album was ranked No. 228 on Rolling Stones list of The 500 Greatest Albums of All Time. The album's title track and their collaboration with Run-DMC on a cover version of "Walk This Way" are included on the Rock and Roll Hall of Fame list of the "500 Songs that Shaped Rock and Roll".

Background
For Aerosmith's previous album, Get Your Wings, the band began working with record producer Jack Douglas, who co-produced that album with Ray Colcord. In the liner notes to the 1993 reissue of Greatest Hits, it was said by an unnamed member of the group that they "nailed" the album.

According to Douglas, "Aerosmith was a different band when we started the third album. They'd been playing Get Your Wings on the road for a year and had become better players - different. It showed in the riffs that Joe [Perry] and Brad [Whitford] brought back from the road for the next album. Toys in the Attic was a much more sophisticated record than the other stuff they'd done." In the band memoir Walk This Way, guitarist Joe Perry stated, "When we started to make Toys in the Attic, our confidence was built up from constant touring." In his autobiography, Perry elaborated:

Composition and recording

Aerosmith's third album includes some of their best-known songs, including "Walk This Way", "Sweet Emotion", and the rollicking title track. "Walk This Way" originated in December 1974 during a soundcheck when Aerosmith was opening for the Guess Who in Honolulu, Hawaii. During the soundcheck, Perry was "fooling around with riffs and thinking about the Meters". Loving "their riffy New Orleans funk, especially 'Cissy Strut' and 'People Say'", he asked the drummer "to lay down something flat with a groove on the drums." The guitar riff to what would become "Walk This Way" just "came off [his] hands." Needing a bridge, he: 

When singer Steven Tyler heard Perry playing that riff he "ran out and sat behind the drums and [they] jammed." Tyler scatted "nonsensical words initially to feel where the lyrics should go before adding them later." When the group was halfway through recording Toys in the Attic in early 1975 at Record Plant in New York City, they found themselves stuck for material. They had written three or four songs for the album, having "to write the rest in the studio." They decided to give the song Perry had come up with in Hawaii a try, but it didn't have lyrics or a title yet. In 1997, Perry recalled that the idea for the funky, James Brown-influenced "Walk This Way" was inspired by the film Young Frankenstein, which the band had gone to see around the time they were working on the track:

At the hotel that night, Tyler wrote lyrics for the song, but left them in the cab on the way to the studio next morning. He says: "I must have been stoned. All the blood drained out of my face, but no one believed me. They thought I never got around to writing them." Upset, he took a cassette tape with the instrumental track they had recorded and a portable tape player with headphones and "disappeared into the stairwell." He "grabbed a few No. 2 pencils" but forgot to take paper. He wrote the lyrics on the wall at "the Record Plant's top floor and then down a few stairs of the back stairway." After "two or three hours" he "ran downstairs for a legal pad and ran back up and copied them down." The lyrics, which tell the story of a high-school boy losing his virginity are sung by Tyler with heavy emphasis being placed on the rhyming lyrics.

Bassist Tom Hamilton came up with the main riff on "Sweet Emotion". In 1997, during a band interview with Alan Di Perna of Guitar World, the members discussed the evolution of the song, which was partially inspired by the Jeff Beck composition "Rice Pudding" from the album Beck-Ola. Hamilton recalled:

Though many of the lyrics to "Sweet Emotion" are about the tension and hatred between the band members and Joe Perry's wife, Tyler himself has said that only some of the lyrics were inspired by Perry's wife. It was stated in Aerosmith's autobiography Walk This Way and in an episode of Behind the Music that growing feuds between the band members' wives (including an incident involving 'spilt milk' where Elyssa Perry threw milk over Tom Hamilton's wife, Terry) may have helped lead to the band's original lineup temporarily dissolving at the end of the 1970s.

Hamilton and Tyler also collaborated on "Uncle Salty", with Tyler recalling in his 2001 autobiography, "Here I was thinking about an orphanage when I wrote those lyrics. I'd try to make the melody weep from the sadness felt when a child is abandoned." Of the title track, Tyler added, "Joe was jamming a riff and I started yelling, 'Toys, toys, toys...' Organic, immediate, infectious... I just started singing and it fit like chocolate and peanut butter. Joe plays his ass off on that song."

The most complex production on the album was "You See Me Crying", a piano ballad that was heavily orchestrated. Jack Douglas brought in a symphony orchestra for the song, which was conducted by Mike Mainieri. The song itself was written by Tyler and outside collaborator Don Solomon. Some of the band members became frustrated with the song, which took a long time to complete, due to the many complex drum and guitar parts. The band's label, Columbia Records, was nonetheless very impressed with the song and the recording process. Bruce Lundvall, then-president of Columbia Records, walked in on the recording sessions for Toys in the Attic when the band was working on the song, and remarked: "You guys got an incredible thing going here. I just came from a Herbie Hancock session and this is much more fun." While Aerosmith were planning the "Back in the Saddle" concert tour and recording the Done with Mirrors album during 1984, a radio DJ played the song. Tyler, who was suffering memory loss at the time from years of drug use, liked "You See Me Crying" so much, he suggested his group record a cover version, only to be told by his bandmate Perry, "It's us, fuckhead."

The album also features a cover of Bullmoose Jackson's "Big Ten-Inch Record", an R&B hit recorded in 1952 and first heard by the band on a tape of Dr. Demento's radio show on KMET. Rather than produce a rock reimagining, Aerosmith's cover largely stays true to the original song, down to its jazz-style instrumentation. In the liner notes to Pandora's Box, Tyler insists that he sings "cept on my big ten inch..." not suck on my big ten inch," but laments that no one on earth believes him.

In the 1997, Tyler shared his memories about writing and recording several of the LP's tracks with author Stephen Davis:

"No More No More": "On a song like 'No More No More', the lyrics came from my verbal diarrhea, a mishmash that I made up and eventually changed the lyrics to something cool... about life on the road: boredom, disillusion, Holiday Inns, stalemate, jailbait. My diary."
"You See Me Crying": "This was when we had a string orchestra in to work on 'You See Me Crying', which I wrote with Don Solomon, a big production conducted by Mike Maineri."
"Sweet Emotion": "Frank Connally sold us to Leber-Krebs for whatI don't know... On 'Sweet Emotion', we used these backward handclaps and four of us in the studio chanting, 'Fuck you, Frank.' If you play it backward, you can hear this."
"Uncle Salty": "Salty worked in a home for lost children and had his way with this little girl. That's what it's about. I'm the little girl, the orphaned boy. I put myself in that place. I'm Uncle Salty too."
"Adam's Apple": I don't remember anything except I arranged it and must have fought for credit. And I originally wanted to call the album Love at First Bite after the line in the song."

At the beginning of 1975, the band started working at The Record Plant in New York City for the album that became Toys in the Attic. The sessions for Toys in the Attic were produced by Douglas without Colcordthe album was engineered by Jay Messina with assistant engineers Rod O'Brien, Corky Stasiak and Dave Thoener. The songs for Toys in the Attic were recorded with a Spectrasonics mixing board and a 16-track tape recorder.

Perry has stated that he wanted to call the LP Rocks, which would be used for their next studio album.

Reception and legacy

Contemporary reviews were mixed. Rolling Stones Gordon Fletcher compared the album unfavourably to Get Your Wings, which in his opinion, was "testimony to the band's raw abilities." He criticised Douglas's production and wrote that, despite "good moments," the band did not avoid "instances of directionless meandering and downright weak material." Robert Christgau was more positive, and remarked on the progress Aerosmith had made in a short time, musically and lyrically. Greg Kot called the album a landmark of hard rock.

Opinions have become more positive over time. AllMusic critic Stephen Thomas Erlewine remarked how Aerosmith "finally perfected their mix of Stonesy raunch and Zeppelin-esque riffing," thanks to "an increased sense of songwriting skills and purpose," creating a new style that "fully embraced sleaziness" in Tyler's lyrics, backed by "an appropriately greasy" music. In Blender, Ben Mitchell found "Aerosmith firing on all coke-clogged cylinders." He lauded all the songs in the album and called the arrangement of "You See Me Crying" "a typical ’70s rock extravagance."

After Toys in the Attic was released in April 1975, it eventually peaked at No. 11 on the US Billboard 200 chart, 63 positions higher than Get Your Wings. Released as a single, "Sweet Emotion" became a minor hit on the Billboard Hot 100 reaching No.36 in 1975, and "Walk This Way" reached No.10 on the Hot 100 in 1977.

The album would gain renewed attention in 1986, 11 years after its release, when hip-hop group Run-DMC covered "Walk This Way" with Aerosmith. This helped revive the latter’s flagging career and helped propel rap rock to the mainstream.

Aerosmith refer to the album and its lyrics in the song "Legendary Child" recorded in 2011. The line "But we traded them toys for other joys" refers to the title of the album and their struggles with addiction. It may also be referring to the title track of the same name. The line "I took a chance at the high school dance never knowing wrong from right" references lyrics from "Walk This Way" and "Adam's Apple".

British band Caravan's Cunning Stunts was to be titled Toys in the Attic, before Aerosmith beat them to it.

Track listing

Personnel
Per liner notes. Track numbers refer to CD and digital releases of the album.

Aerosmith
Steven Tylervocals, keyboards, harmonica, percussion
Joe Perrylead guitar (except track 8, second solo on track 9), rhythm guitar on track 8, acoustic guitar, slide guitar, talkbox (6), backing vocals, percussion
Brad Whitfordrhythm guitar (except tracks 8–9), lead guitar (track 8, first and coda solo on track 9)
Tom Hamiltonbass guitar, rhythm guitar (track 2)
Joey Kramerdrums, percussion

Additional musicians
Scott Cushnie – piano on "Big Ten Inch Record", and "No More No More"
Jay Messina – bass marimba on "Sweet Emotion"
Mike Mainieri – orchestra conductor on "You See Me Crying"
Uncredited – horn section on "Big Ten Inch Record"

Production

Jack Douglas – producer
Jay Messina – engineer
Rod O'Brien, Corky Stasiak, Dave Thoener – assistant engineers
Doug Sax – mastering
Bob Belott – original photography
Pacific Eye & Ear – album design
Ingrid Haenke – illustration
Jimmy Lenner, Jr. – still life photography
Leslie Lambert – still life collage design
David Krebs, Steve Leber – management
Lisa Sparagano – 1993 package design
Ken Fredette – 1993 package design
Vic Anesini – remastering engineer

Charts

Weekly charts

Year-end charts

Singles

Certifications

References

Bibliography

1975 albums
Aerosmith albums
Albums produced by Jack Douglas (record producer)
Albums recorded at Record Plant (New York City)
Columbia Records albums